Thomas Flynn (fl. 1834) was an English-born American actor and comedian who, with his wife, was a popular performer at the Bowery Theatre in the mid-1830s.  After the Farren Riots he briefly took over management of the Bowery.

References

Year of birth missing
Year of death missing
American male stage actors
19th-century American male actors
British emigrants to the United States